Herald on Sunday may refer to:

 Herald on Sunday, the Sunday publication of The New Zealand Herald
 Herald on Sunday, the Sunday publication of The Herald (based in Glasgow)

Sunday newspapers